Maria Cândido may refer to 

 Maria Cândido (born 1939), Brazilian artist
 Maria Fernanda Cândido (born 1974), Brazilian actress
 Maria Rosa Candido (1967–1993), Italian speed skater

See also
 Candido
 Cândido 
 Cándido